Gaznahleh (also Romanized as Gaz Nahleh; also known as Ganzaleh and Gaznahād) is a village in Sarab Rural District, in the Central District of Sonqor County, Kermanshah Province, Iran. At the 2006 census, its population was 638, in 175 families.

References 

Populated places in Sonqor County